Christer Espevoll (born October 18, 1977) is a Norwegian guitarist who has been active since 1993. He has performed with notable acts such as Extol and Benea Reach. Christer's brother is Peter Espevoll.

Background
Espevoll started his musical career with his cousin David Husvik and brother Peter Espevoll. Espevoll formed the band with Husvik and then hired on his brother, in the fall of 1993. Espevoll was 16 and his brother was 14 at the formation of the band. Alongside his cousin and brother, the band hired on Ole Børud and Eyestein Holm as Guitarist and Bassist. The band had major success, first starting with labels Solid State Records, moving up to Century Media Records. In 2004, both Espevoll and Børud left the band. After their departure from the band, Espevoll joined Benea Reach, while Børud focused on his solo music. The band released two albums before his departure in 2008. Espevoll has been musically inactive until about 2016, when he formed Azusa with Husvik and Liam Wilson (ex-The Dillinger Escape Plan, John Frum, ex-Frodus). The band recently signed to Extol's former label, Solid State Records, with the addition of Sea + Air's Vocalist Eleni Zafiriadou.

Bands
Current
Azusa (2014–present)

Former
Extol (1993-2004)
Benea Reach (2003-2011)
Absurd² (1999-2004)

Discography
Extol

Studio albums
 1998: Burial
 2000: Undeceived
 2003: Synergy

EPs
 1999: Mesmerized
 2001: Paralysis

Compilations
 1996: Northern Lights / Norwegian Metal Compilation (Rowe Productions 012)

Benea Reach
 2006: Monument Bineothan
 2008: Alleviat

Absurd²
 2004: Absurd² EP

Azusa
 2018: Heavy Yoke
 2020: Loop of Yesterdays

References

Living people
Musicians from Bærum
Norwegian rock guitarists
Norwegian male guitarists
Christian metal musicians
1977 births
21st-century Norwegian guitarists
21st-century Norwegian male musicians
Extol members